Serbia men's national under-20 and under-21 basketball team may refer to:
 Serbia men's national under-21 basketball team
 Serbia men's national under-20 basketball team